The women's team pursuit in the 2010–11 ISU Speed Skating World Cup was contested over three races on three occasions, out of a total of eight World Cup occasions for the season, with the first occasion involving the distance taking place in Berlin, Germany, on 19–21 November 2010, and the final occasion involving the distance taking place in Moscow, Russia, on 4–6 March 2011.

The Netherlands won the cup, while Germany came second, and Norway came third. The defending champions, Canada, came fifth.

Top three

Race medallists

Standings
Standings as of 6 March 2011 (end of the season).

References

Women team pursuit
ISU